People's Leasing & Finance PLC, sometimes called People's Leasing Company or commonly abbreviated PLC, is a licensed non-banking financial company in Sri Lanka. The company is ranked 30th in LMD 100, an annual list of leading listed companies in Sri Lanka. Brand Finance placed the company 21st amongst the 100 most valuable brands in Sri Lanka. The company was incorporated in 1995 and in 2010 listed on the Colombo Stock Exchange. 75% of the shares of the company is held by the People's Bank, one of the two government-held banks of Sri Lanka.

History
The company was incorporated in 1995 as a limited liability company. During 2008/09 the company diversified into new business  areas by forming two subsidiaries. People's Insurance Ltd was incorporated as a wholly-owned subsidiary in 2009/10. The company was listed on the Colombo Stock Exchange in 2010. The company merged with its subsidiary People's Finance PLC in 2013/14. The company appointed a new CEO, Shamindra Marcelline in November 2020.

Operations
Fitch Ratings affirmed the A+ credit rating for People's Leasing in September 2021 and the outlook is adjudged as stable in September 2021. With a market share of 12% of the Finance and Leasing Company sector, the company is one of the largest finance and leasing companies in the country. People's Leasing ranked 27th in Business Today's Top 40 for the year 2020/21. The company recorded the highest profit in the history of the company for the year 2020/21. In 2021, the company issued LKR10 billion debentures and received applications for over LKR14 billion by the closure. At the 56th Charted Accountants Awards, organised by the Institute of Chartered Accountants of Sri Lanka, the company received the silver award for the annual report 2020/21 in finance and leasing companies sector. The company relocated its metropolitan branch to Vauxall Street in Slave Island, Colombo after renovation in December 2021. The premises was inaugurated by the company's chairman, Sujeewa Rajapakse.

See also
 List of Sri Lankan public corporations by market capitalisation

References

External links
 Official website

1995 establishments in Sri Lanka
Companies listed on the Colombo Stock Exchange
Financial services companies of Sri Lanka
Financial services companies established in 1995